Pastrogor Peak is the partly ice-free peak rising to 1289 m near the north end of Sentinel Range in Ellsworth Mountains, Antarctica.  It is named after the settlement of Pastrogor in Southern Bulgaria.

Location
US mapping in 1961.

See also
 Mountains in Antarctica

Maps
 Newcomer Glacier.  Scale 1:250 000 topographic map.  Reston, Virginia: US Geological Survey, 1961.
 Antarctic Digital Database (ADD). Scale 1:250000 topographic map of Antarctica. Scientific Committee on Antarctic Research (SCAR). Since 1993, regularly updated.

Notes

References
 Pastrogor Peak SCAR Composite Gazetteer of Antarctica
 Bulgarian Antarctic Gazetteer Antarctic Place-names Commission (in Bulgarian)
 Basic data (in English)

External links
 Pastrogor Peak. Copernix satellite image

Ellsworth Mountains
Bulgaria and the Antarctic
Mountains of Ellsworth Land